Lily Brazel (born 26 January 1995) is an Australian field hockey player.

Brazel was born in Sydney, New South Wales, and made her senior international debut at the 2017 International Festival of Hockey.

In May 2018, Brazel scored her first international goal at the 2018 Women's Tri-Nations Hockey Tournament in New Zealand, in a match against New Zealand.

Brazel was also a member of the Jillaroos, the Australian Under 21 women's team, at the 2013 Junior World Cup in Mönchengladbach, Germany, where the team finished 6th.

References

External links

Australian female field hockey players
Sportspeople from Sydney
1995 births
Living people
Female field hockey defenders
Sportswomen from New South Wales
21st-century Australian women